Caloundra RSL Cup could refer to several sporting competitions on Australias Sunshine Coast. These include;

 A Cricket Competition
 A Rugby League Competition